The  earless seals, phocids or true seals are one of the three main groups of mammals within the seal lineage, Pinnipedia. All true seals are members of the family Phocidae. They are sometimes called crawling seals to distinguish them from the fur seals and sea lions of the family Otariidae. Seals live in the oceans of both hemispheres and, with the exception of the more tropical monk seals, are mostly confined to polar, subpolar, and temperate climates.  The Baikal seal is the only species of exclusively freshwater seal.

Taxonomy and evolution

Evolution
 

The earliest known fossil earless seal is Noriphoca gaudini from the late Oligocene or earliest Miocene (Aquitanian) of Italy. Other early fossil phocids date from the mid-Miocene, 15 million years ago in the north Atlantic. Until recently, many researchers believed that phocids evolved separately from otariids and odobenids; and that they evolved from otter-like animals, such as Potamotherium, which inhabited European freshwater lakes. Recent evidence strongly suggests a monophyletic origin for all pinnipeds from a single ancestor, possibly Enaliarctos, most closely related to the mustelids and bears.

Monk seals and elephant seals were previously believed to have first entered the Pacific through the open straits between North and South America, with the Antarctic true seals either using the same route or travelled down the west coast of Africa. It is now thought that the monk seals, elephant seals, and Antarctic seals all evolved in the southern hemisphere, and likely dispersed to their current distributions from more southern latitudes.

Taxonomy

In the 1980s and 1990s, morphological phylogenetic analysis of the phocids led to new conclusions about the interrelatedness of the various genera. More recent molecular phylogenetic analyses have confirmed the monophyly of the two phocid subfamilies (Phocinae and Monachinae). The Monachinae (known as the "southern" seals), is composed of three tribes; the Lobodontini, Miroungini, and Monachini. The four Antarctic genera Hydrurga, Leptonychotes, Lobodon, and Ommatophoca are part of the tribe Lobodontini. Tribe Miroungini is composed of the elephant seals. The Monk seals (Monachus and Neomonachus) are all part of the tribe Monachini. Likewise, subfamily Phocinae (the "northern" seals) also includes three tribes; Erignathini (Erignathus), Cystophorini (Cystophora), and Phocini (all other phocines). More recently, five species have been split off from Phoca, forming three additional genera.

Alternatively the three monachine tribes have been evaluated to familiar status, which elephant seals and the Antarctic seals are more closely related to the phocines.

Extant genera

Biology

External anatomy

Phocids have fewer teeth than land-based members of the Carnivora, although they retain powerful canines. Some species lack molars altogether. The dental formula is:

While otariids are known for speed and maneuverability, phocids are known for efficient, economical movement. This allows most phocids to forage far from land to exploit prey resources, while otariids are tied to rich upwelling zones close to breeding sites. Phocids swim by sideways movements of their bodies, using their hind flippers to fullest effect. Their fore flippers are used primarily for steering, while their hind flippers are bound to the pelvis in such a way that they cannot bring them under their bodies to walk on them. They are more streamlined than fur seals and sea lions, so they can swim more effectively over long distances. However, because they cannot turn their hind flippers downward, they are very clumsy on land, having to wriggle with their front flippers and abdominal muscles.

Phocid respiratory and circulatory systems are adapted to allow diving to considerable depths, and they can spend a long time underwater between breaths. Air is forced from the lungs during a dive and into the upper respiratory passages, where gases cannot easily be absorbed into the bloodstream. This helps protect the seal from the bends. The middle ear is also lined with blood sinuses that inflate during diving, helping to maintain a constant pressure.

Phocids are more specialized for aquatic life than otariids. They lack external ears and have sleek, streamlined bodies. Retractable nipples, internal testicles, and an internal penile sheath provide further streamlining. A smooth layer of blubber lies underneath the skin. Phocids are able to divert blood flow to this layer to help control their temperatures.

Communication

Unlike otariids, true seals do not communicate by 'barking'. Instead, they communicate by slapping the water and grunting.

Reproduction

Phocids spend most of their time at sea, although they return to land or pack ice to breed and give birth. Pregnant females spend long periods foraging at sea, building up fat reserves, and then return to the breeding site to use their stored energy to nurse pups. However, the common seal displays a reproductive strategy similar to that used by otariids, in which the mother makes short foraging trips between nursing bouts.

Because a phocid mother's feeding grounds are often hundreds of kilometers from the breeding site, she must fast while lactating. This combination of fasting with lactation requires the mother to provide large amounts of energy to her pup at a time when she is not eating (and often, not drinking). Mothers must supply their own metabolic needs while nursing. This is a miniature version of the humpback whales' strategy, which involves fasting during their months-long migration from arctic feeding areas to tropical breeding/nursing areas and back.

Phocids produce thick, fat-rich milk that allows them to provide their pups with large amounts of energy in a short period. This allows the mother to return to the sea in time to replenish her reserves. Lactation ranges from five to seven weeks in the monk seal to just three to five days in the hooded seal. The mother ends nursing by leaving her pup at the breeding site to search for food (pups continue to nurse if given the opportunity). "Milk stealers" that suckle from unrelated, sleeping females are not uncommon; this often results in the death of the mother's pup, since a female can only feed one pup.

Growth and maturation

The pup's diet is so high in calories, it builds up a fat store. Before the pup is ready to forage, the mother abandons it, and the pup consumes its own fat for weeks or even months while it matures. Seals, like all marine mammals, need time to develop the oxygen stores, swimming muscles, and neural pathways necessary for effective diving and foraging. Seal pups typically eat no food and drink no water during the period, although some polar species eat snow. The postweaning fast ranges from two weeks in the hooded seal to 9–12 weeks in the northern elephant seal. The physiological and behavioral adaptations that allow phocid pups to endure these remarkable fasts, which are among the longest for any mammal, remain an area of active study and research.

Feeding strategy 

Phocids make use of at least four different feeding strategies: suction feeding, grip, and tear feeding, filter feeding, and pierce feeding. Each of these feeding strategies is aided by a specialized skull, mandible, and tooth morphology. However, despite morphological specialization, most phocids are opportunistic and employ multiple strategies to capture and eat prey. For example, the leopard seal, Hydrurga leptonyx, uses grip and tear feeding to prey on penguins, suction feeding to consume small fish, and filter feeding to catch krill.

See also

 Eared seal
 Marine mammals as food

References

External links

Extant Miocene first appearances
Pinnipeds
Taxa named by John Edward Gray